Belinda is the debut studio album by Spanish singer and actress Belinda Peregrín. It was released in Mexico by Sony BMG Mexico and internationally by RCA Records on August 5, 2003. The album was certified triple Platinum and Gold in Mexico on March 11, 2005.

Album information 
Her international self-titled album Belinda was released by Sony BMG and RCA Records on August 5, 2003, with success, topping many countries including Mexico. The album was produced by Mauri Stern, Robin Barter, Graeme Pleeth and Rudy Pérez. It included hit singles such as "Lo Siento", "Boba Niña Nice", and "Ángel", the single "Vivir", was also chosen as the main theme song for Corazones al límite, a soap opera that she briefly appeared in. There were multiple releases of the album from 2003 through 2004, including remixes and bonus tracks. Belinda was later released on February 25, 2005, along with the DVD Tour Fiesta en la Azotea.

Promotion 
Belinda promoted the album with the Fiesta en la Azotea Tour, between 2004 and 2005. She performed over 200 times across Mexico, Guatemala, Puerto Rico, El Salvador, Panamá, Colombia, Chile, Argentina, Venezuela, United States, Portugal and Spain. The attendance broke records with 1.8 million people mark. She broke the record after 12 sold-out concerts at the National Auditorium. At the Zócalo (Mexico City) she had an attendance of over 125,000.

She performed Lo Siento on Escandalo on July 14, 2003; on Hoy on August 6, 2003, and on TVE on December 7, 2003. Boba Niña Nice on Hoy on August 6, 2003, and on Tesoro de la Navidad on December 22, 2003. Ángel on No Manches on December 20, 2003; on Raul Gil on June 3, 2004; on Otro Rollo on July 26, 2004, and on El Show de Cristina on September 3, 2004. Vivir on No Manches on August 14, 2004; on Despierta America on August 30, 2004. No Entiendo on Hoy on November 2, 2005; on SIC on December 16, 2005, and on TVE on December 20, 2005.

Commercial performance 
Belinda debuted at number #8 on the Mexican Albums Chart in August 2003. It topped the chart for 4 weeks in 2004, and 4 weeks in 2005. The album was certified Gold on September 7, 2003; Platinum on November 25, 2003; Platinum+Gold on February 11, 2004; Double Platinum on November 5, 2004; Double Platinum+Gold on December 1, 2004; Triple Platinum on March 11, 2005; Triple Platinum+Gold on November 2, 2005.

It debuted at #72 and later made the Top 40 in Spain, where it was certified Gold for over 50,000 copies sold.  'Belinda'  peaked at #6 on U.S. Billboard Latin Pop Albums and sold over 177,000 copies on the US. Selling over 0.5 million copies worldwide, it is her best-selling album.

Track listing

DVD
 "Lo Siento"
 "Boba Niña Nice"
 "Ángel"
 Detrás de Cámaras "Ángel"
 Detrás de Cámaras "Azotea"

Charts

Sales and certifications

References 

2003 debut albums
Albums produced by Rudy Pérez
Belinda Peregrín albums